Now + 4eva is the fifth studio album by Australian indie pop band Architecture in Helsinki. It was released in Australia on 28 March 2014 through the band's own imprint Casual Workout via Inertia. The group also embarked on a tour of the east coast of Australia in support of the album. Online pre-orders of the album from retailer JB Hi-Fi included a signed, printed "zine" detailing the band's inspirations.

Two singles, "In the Future" and "Dream a Little Crazy", were released ahead of the album in 2013. Third single "I Might Survive", which Stereogum called "a smooth, percussive, horn-laden disco track", was released on 21 February 2014. A music video for "Dream a Little Crazy" was released on 28 January and depicts what Noisey described as a "biological bakery".

Frontman Cameron Bird stated in March 2014 that the album had been finished for "almost a year". Now + 4eva also includes a cover of the song "When You Walk in the Room", originally written and sung by Jackie DeShannon, but more famously covered by English band The Searchers.

The album received generally mixed, if slightly negative reviews.

Track listing

Personnel

 Brendyn Adams – mixing assistant
 Architecture in Helsinki – production
 Zoe Barry – cello
 Daniel Beasy – trumpet
 Cameron Bird – art direction, composition
 Margaret Bird – tributee
 Tristan Ceddia – design, typography
 Biddy Connor – viola
 Jackie DeShannon – composition
 Gus Franklin – composition, engineering
 Tim Harvey – background vocals
 Joe LaPorta – mastering
 Steve Majstorovic – baritone saxophone
 Haima Marriott – additional production, bass, composition, engineering
 Jamie Mildren – composition
 Evelyn Morris – background vocals
 Jordan Murray – trombone
 Santtu Mustonen – cover art
 Steph O'Hara – violin
 Sam Perry – composition
 Bec Rigby – background vocals
 Kellie Sutherland – composition
 Damian Taylor – mixing
 Francois Tetaz – composition, engineering, mixing, production
 Michelle Tran	– photography

Credits adapted from AllMusic.

Charts

References

2014 albums
Architecture in Helsinki albums